In a religious context, sin is a transgression against divine law or a law of God. Each culture has its own interpretation of what it means to commit a sin. While sins are generally considered actions, any thought, word, or act considered immoral, selfish, shameful, harmful, or alienating might be termed "sinful".

Etymology
From Middle English sinne, synne, sunne, zen, from Old English synn (“sin”), from Proto-West Germanic *sunnju, from Proto-Germanic *sunjō (“truth, excuse”) and *sundī, *sundijō (“sin”), from Proto-Indo-European *h₁s-ónt-ih₂, from *h₁sónts ("being, true", implying a verdict of "truly guilty" against an accusation or charge), from *h₁es- (“to be”); compare Old English sōþ ("true"; see sooth). Doublet of suttee.

Bahá'í

Baháʼís consider humans to be naturally good, fundamentally spiritual beings. Human beings were created because of God's immeasurable love for us. However, the Baháʼí teachings compare the human heart to a mirror, which, if turned away from the light of the sun (i.e. God), is incapable of receiving God's love. It is only by turning unto God that spiritual advancement can be made. In this sense, "sinning" is to follow the inclinations of one's own lower nature, to turn the mirror of one's heart away from God. One of the main hindrances to spiritual development is the Baháʼí concept of the "insistent self" which is a self-serving inclination within all people. Baháʼís interpret this to be the true meaning of Satan, often referred to in the Baháʼí Writings as "the Evil One".Watch over yourselves, for the Evil One is lying in wait, ready to entrap you. Gird yourselves against his wicked devices, and, led by the light of the name of the All-Seeing God, make your escape from the darkness that surroundeth you. — Baháʼu'lláhThis lower nature in humans is symbolized as Satan — the evil ego within us, not an evil personality outside. — ʻAbdu'l-Bahá

Buddhism

There are a few differing Buddhist views on sin. American Zen author Brad Warner states that in Buddhism there is no concept of sin at all. The Buddha Dharma Education Association also expressly states "The idea of sin or original sin has no place in Buddhism."

Ethnologist Christoph von Fürer-Haimendorf explained, "In Buddhist thinking the whole universe, men as well as gods, are subject to a reign of law. Every action, good or bad, has an inevitable and automatic effect in a long chain of causes, an effect that is independent of the will of any deity. Even though this may leave no room for the concept of 'sin' in the sense of an act of defiance against the authority of a personal god, Buddhists speak of 'sin' when referring to transgressions against the universal moral code."

However, Anantarika-kamma in Theravada Buddhism is a heinous crime, which through karmic process brings immediate disaster. In Mahayana Buddhism these five crimes are referred to as pañcānantarya (Pāli), and are mentioned in The Sutra Preached by the Buddha on the Total Extinction of the Dharma, The five crimes or sins are:
 Injuring a Buddha
 Killing an Arhat
 Creating schism in the society of Sangha
 Matricide
 Patricide

Christianity

Hamartiology

The doctrine of sin is central to Christianity, since its basic message is about redemption in Christ. Christian hamartiology describes sin as an act of offense against God by despising his persons and Christian biblical law, and by injuring others. In Christian views it is an evil human act, which violates the rational nature of man as well as God's nature and his eternal law. According to the classical definition of St. Augustine of Hippo sin is "a word, deed, or desire in opposition to the eternal law of God."  Thus, sin requires redemption, a metaphor alluding to atonement, in which the death of Jesus is the price that is paid to release the faithful from the bondage of sin. In some forms of Christianity, it also requires reparation (see penance).

Among some scholars, sin is understood mostly as a legal infraction or contract violation of non-binding philosophical frameworks and perspectives of Christian ethics, and so salvation tends to be viewed in legal terms. Other Christian scholars understand sin to be fundamentally relational—a loss of love for the Christian God and an elevation of self-love ("concupiscence", in this sense), as was later propounded by Augustine in his debate with the Pelagians. As with the legal definition of sin, this definition also affects the understanding of Christian grace and salvation, which are thus viewed in relational terms.

Original sin

This condition has been characterized in many ways, ranging from something as insignificant as the tendency toward sin, referred to as a "sin nature", to something as drastic as total depravity, the teaching that humans, apart from God's grace, are incapable of choosing to do good.

The concept of original sin was first alluded to in the 2nd century by Irenaeus, Bishop of Lyon in his controversy with certain dualist Gnostics. Other church fathers such as Augustine also shaped and developed the doctrine, seeing it as based on the New Testament teaching of Paul the Apostle (Romans  and 1 Corinthians ) and the Old Testament verse of Psalms . Tertullian, Cyprian, Ambrose and Ambrosiaster considered that humanity shares in Adam's sin, transmitted by human generation. Augustine's formulation of original sin after 412 CE was popular among Protestant reformers, such as Martin Luther and John Calvin, who equated original sin with concupiscence (or "hurtful desire"), affirming that it persisted even after baptism and completely destroyed freedom to do good. Before 412 CE, Augustine said that free will was weakened but not destroyed by original sin. But after 412 CE this changed to a loss of free will except to sin. Modern Augustinian Calvinism holds this later view. The Jansenist movement, which the Catholic Church declared to be heretical, also maintained that original sin destroyed freedom of will. Instead the Catholic Church declares that Baptism erases original sin. Methodist theology teaches that original sin is eradicted through entire sanctification.

Islam

Sin is an important concept in Islamic ethics. Muslims see sin as anything that goes against the commands of God (Allah), a breach of the laws and norms laid down by religion. Islam teaches that sin is an act and not a state of being. It is believed that God weighs an individual's good deeds against his or her sins on the Day of Judgement and punishes those individuals whose evil deeds outweigh their good deeds. These individuals are thought to be sentenced to an afterlife in the fires of jahannam (Hell).

Islamic terms for sin include dhanb and khaṭīʾa, which are synonymous and refer to intentional sins; khiṭʾ, which means simply a sin; and ithm, which is used for grave sins.

Judaism

Judaism regards the violation of any of the 613 commandments as a sin. Judaism teaches that to sin is a part of life, since there is no perfect man and everyone has an inclination to do evil. Sin has many classifications and degrees, but the principal classification is that of "missing the mark" (cheit in Hebrew). Some sins are punishable with death by the court, others with death by heaven, others with lashes, and others without such punishment, but no sins committed with willful intentions go without consequence. Sins committed out of lack of knowledge are not considered sins, since sin cannot be a sin if the one who committed it did not know it was wrong. Unintentional sins are considered less severe sins.

Sins between people are considered much more serious in Judaism than sins between man and God. Yom Kippur, the main day of repentance in Judaism, can atone for sins between man and God, but not for sins between man and his fellow, that is until he has appeased his friend. Eleazar ben Azariah derived [this from the verse]: "From all your sins before God you shall be cleansed" (Book of Leviticus, 16:30) – for sins between man and God Yom Kippur atones, but for sins between man and his fellow Yom Kippur does not atone until he appeases his fellow.

When the Temple yet stood in Jerusalem, people would offer Korbanot (sacrifices) for their misdeeds. The atoning aspect of korbanot is carefully circumscribed. For the most part, korbanot only expiate unintentional sins, that is, sins committed because a person forgot that this thing was a sin or by mistake. No atonement is needed for violations committed under duress or through lack of knowledge, and for the most part, korbanot cannot atone for a malicious, deliberate sin. In addition, korbanot have no expiating effect unless the person making the offering sincerely repents of his or her actions before making the offering, and makes restitution to any person who was harmed by the violation.

Judaism teaches that all willful sin has consequences. The completely righteous suffer for their sins (by humiliation, poverty, and suffering that God sends them) in this world and receive their reward in the world to come. The in-between (not completely righteous or completely wicked), suffer for and repent their sins after death and thereafter join the righteous. The very evil do not repent even at the gates of hell. Such people prosper in this world to receive their reward for any good deed, but cannot be cleansed by and hence cannot leave gehinnom, because they do not or cannot repent. This world can therefore seem unjust where the righteous suffer, while the wicked prosper. Many great thinkers have contemplated this.

Shinto
The Shinto concept of sin is inexorably linked to concepts of purity and pollution. Shinto does not have a concept of original sin, instead believing that all human beings are born pure. Sin, also called Tsumi, is anything that makes people impure (i.e. anything that separates them from the kami). However, Shinto does not believe this impurity is the result of human actions, but rather the result of evil spirits or other external factors.

Sin can have a variety of consequences in Japan, including disaster and disease. Because of this, purification rituals, or Harae, are viewed as important not just to the spiritual and physical health of the individual, but to the well-being of the nation.

See also

 Actual sin
 Devil
 Ethics in religion
 Haram
 Internal sin
 Crime
 Karma
 Morality
 Religious law
 Sin offering
 Taboo
 Wickedness

Notes and references

Further reading

 Fredriksen, Paula. Sin: The Early History of an Idea. Princeton: Princeton University Press, 2012. .
 Granoff; P E; Shinohara, Koichi; eds. (2012), Sins and Sinners: Perspectives from Asian Religions. Brill. .
 Hein, David. "Regrets Only: A Theology of Remorse." The Anglican 33, no. 4 (October 2004): 5–6.
 Lewis, C.S. "Miserable Offenders": an Interpretation of [sinfulness and] Prayer Book Language [about it], in series, The Advent Papers. Cincinnati, Ohio: Forward Movement Publications, [196-].

 Pieper, Josef. The Concept of Sin. Edward T. Oakes SJ (translation from German). South Bend, Indiana: St. Augustine's Press, 2001. 
 Schumacher, Meinolf. Sündenschmutz und Herzensreinheit: Studien zur Metaphorik der Sünde in lateinischer und deutscher Literatur des Mittelalters. Munich: Fink, 1996.

External links

 The Different Kinds of Sins (Catholic)
 
 

 
Christian hamartiology
Religious belief and doctrine
Religious ethics
Religious terminology